Selvia Miller, Jr. (born November 26, 1957) is an American professional football player who was a tight end in the National Football League (NFL) for five seasons during the 1980s.  Miller played college football for the Nebraska Cornhuskers and earned All-American honors.  He was selected in the first round of the 1980 NFL Draft, played professionally for the Atlanta Falcons and New Orleans Saints of the NFL, and was twice selected to the Pro Bowl.

Miller was born in Midland, Texas.  He attended Robert E. Lee High School in Midland, and was a standout high school football player for the Lee Rebels.  He was the nephew of Navy Cross winner Doris Miller.

He attended the University of Nebraska, where he played for coach Tom Osborne's Conhusker teams from 1976 to 1979.  As a senior in 1979, he was recognized as a consensus first-team All-American.

He was selected for the Pro Bowl in 1980 and 1981. Miller previously held the Atlanta Falcons' franchise record for most receiving touchdowns by a rookie with 9, it was broken in 2018 by Calvin Ridley who had 10.

1957 births
Living people
All-American college football players
American football tight ends
Atlanta Falcons players
Nebraska Cornhuskers football players
New Orleans Saints players
National Conference Pro Bowl players
Robert E. Lee High School (Midland, Texas) alumni